Catbrook is a village in Monmouthshire, south east Wales, United Kingdom. The population in 2011 was 412.

Location 
It is in the community of Trellech United, just under two miles south of Trellech village.

History and amenities 
Catbrook is set high above Tintern Abbey and the Wye Valley AONB and overlooks the Forest of Dean across the river in Gloucestershire.

In 2004 Melanie Chisholm, singer and member of the Spice Girls, purchased a house in the village.

References

External links
 Catbrook tin chapel

Villages in Monmouthshire